Gnathia is a genus of isopod crustaceans, containing the following species:

Gnathia africana Barnard, 1914
Gnathia albescens Hansen, 1916
Gnathia alces Monod, 1926
Gnathia andrei Pires, 1996
Gnathia antarctica (Studer, 1883)
Gnathia antonbruunae Kensley, Schotte & Poore, 2009
Gnathia arabica Schotte, 1995
Gnathia arctica Gurjanova, 1929
Gnathia asperifrons Holdich & Harrison, 1980
Gnathia aureola Stebbing, 1900
Gnathia aureumaculosa Ferreiera, Smit, Grutter & Davies, 2009
Gnathia barnardi Smit & Basson, 2002
Gnathia beethoveni Paul & Menzies, 1971
Gnathia bengalensis Kumari, Hanumantha, Rao & Shyamasundari, 1993
Gnathia biorbis Holdich & Harrison, 1980
Gnathia brachyuropus Monod, 1926
Gnathia brucei George, 2003
Gnathia bungoensis Nunomura, 1982
Gnathia calamitosa Monod, 1926
Gnathia calmani Monod, 1926
Gnathia calsi Mueller, 1993
Gnathia camponotus Cohen & Poore, 1994
Gnathia camuripenis Tanaka, 2004
Gnathia capillata Nunomura, 2004
Gnathia cerina (Stimpson, 1853)
Gnathia clementensis Schultz, 1966
Gnathia cooki Mueller, 1989
Gnathia coralmaris Svavarsson & Bruce, 2012
Gnathia cornuta Holdich & Harrison, 1980
Gnathia coronadoensis Schultz, 1966
Gnathia cryptopais Barnard, 1925
Gnathia dentata (G. O. Sars, 1872)
Gnathia derzhavini Gurjanova, 1933
Gnathia disjuncta Barnard, 1920
Gnathia epopstruma Cohen & Poore, 1994
Gnathia eumeces Kensley, Schotte & Poore, 2009
Gnathia excavata Ota, 2012
Gnathia falcipenis Holdich & Harrison, 1980
Gnathia fallax Monod, 1926
Gnathia firingae Mueller, 1991
Gnathia fragilis Schultz, 1977
Gnathia glauca Kensley, Schotte & Poore, 2009
Gnathia gonzalezi Mueller, 1988
Gnathia grandilaris Coetzee, Smit, Grutter & Davies, 2008
Gnathia grutterae M. Ferreira, N. Smit & A. Davies, 2010
Gnathia gurjanovae Golovan, 2006
Gnathia halei Cals, 1973
Gnathia hamletgast Svavarsson & Bruce, 2012
Gnathia hemingwayi Ortiz & Lalana, 1997
Gnathia hirayamai Nunomura, 1992
Gnathia hirsuta Schultz, 1966
Gnathia illepidus (Wagner, 1869)
Gnathia incana Menzies & George, 1972
Gnathia indoinsularis Svavarsson & Jorundsdottir, 2004
Gnathia inopinata Monod, 1925
Gnathia iridomyrmex Cohen & Poore, 1994
Gnathia johanna Monod, 1926
Gnathia kumejimensis Ota, 2012
Gnathia lacunacapitalis Menzies & George, 1972
Gnathia latidens (Beddard, 1886)
Gnathia lignophila Mueller, 1993
Gnathia limicola Ota, Tanaka & Hirose, 2007
Gnathia luxata Kensley, Schotte & Poore, 2009
Gnathia maculosa Y. Ota & E. Hirose, 2009
Gnathia magdalenensis Mueller, 1988
Gnathia malaysiensis Mueller, 1993
Gnathia margaritarum Monod, 1926
Gnathia marionis Svavarsson & Bruce, 2012
Gnathia marleyi Farquharson, Smit & Sikkel, 2012
Gnathia masca Farquharson et al., 2012
Gnathia maxillaris (Montagu, 1804)
Gnathia meticola Holdich & Harrison, 1980
Gnathia micheli Ortiz, Winfield & Varela, 2012
Gnathia mulieraria Hale, 1924
Gnathia mutsuensis Nunomura, 2004
Gnathia mystrium Cohen & Poore, 1994
Gnathia nicembola Mueller, 1989
Gnathia nkulu Smit & Van As, 2000
Gnathia notostigma Cohen & Poore, 1994
Gnathia nubila Ota & Hirose, 2009
Gnathia odontomachus Cohen & Poore, 1994
Gnathia oxyuraea (Lilljeborg, 1855)
Gnathia panousei Daguerre de Hureaux, 1971
Gnathia pantherina Smit & Basson, 2002
Gnathia perimulica Monod, 1926
Gnathia phallonajopsis Monod, 1925
Gnathia philogona Monod, 1926
Gnathia pilosus Hadfield, Smit & Avenant-Oldewage, 2008
Gnathia piscivora Paperna & Por, 1977
Gnathia productatridens Menzies & Barnard, 1959
Gnathia prolasius Cohen & Poore, 1994
Gnathia puertoricensis Menzies & Glynn, 1968
Gnathia rathi Kensley, 1984
Gnathia rectifrons Gurjanova, 1933
Gnathia rhytidoponera Cohen & Poore, 1994
Gnathia ricardoi Pires, 1996
Gnathia samariensis Mueller, 1988
Gnathia sanrikuensis Nunomura, 1998
Gnathia scabra Ota, 2012
Gnathia schmidti Gurjanova, 1933
Gnathia serrula Kensley, Schotte & Poore, 2009
Gnathia serrulatifrons Monod, 1926
Gnathia sifae Svavarsson, 2006
Gnathia somalia Kensley, Schotte & Poore, 2009
Gnathia spongicola Barnard, 1920
Gnathia steveni Menzies, 1962
Gnathia stigmacros Cohen & Poore, 1994
Gnathia stoddarti Kensley, Schotte & Poore, 2009
Gnathia taprobanensis Monod, 1926
Gnathia teissieri Cals, 1972
Gnathia teruyukiae Ota, 2011
Gnathia tridens Menzies & Barnard, 1959
Gnathia trilobata Schultz, 1966
Gnathia trimaculata Coetzee, Smit, Grutter & Davies, 2009
Gnathia triospathiona Boone, 1918
Gnathia tuberculata Richardson, 1909
Gnathia tuberculosa (Beddard, 1886)
Gnathia ubatuba Pires, 1996
Gnathia varanus Svavarsson & Bruce, 2012
Gnathia variobranchia Holdich & Harrison, 1980
Gnathia vellosa Mueller, 1988
Gnathia venusta Monod, 1925
Gnathia virginalis Monod, 1926
Gnathia vorax (Lucas, 1849)
Gnathia wagneri Monod, 1925
Gnathia wisteri Svavarsson & Bruce, 2012
Gnathia zanzibarensis Kensley, Schotte & Poore, 2009

References

Further reading

External links

Cymothoida